The Cincinnati Comets was an American soccer club based in Cincinnati, Ohio that was a member of the American Soccer League. The Comets won the ASL in 1972, led by 16-year-old Costa Rican-American midfielder Ringo Cantillo who would win Most Valuable Player that year. At the time Cantillo was a high school student at McNicholas High School and living with head coach Nick Capurro. Cantillo would go on to win MVP 3 more times in the ASL. The following year in 1973 the Comets would advance to the championship again ultimately losing to the New York Apollo.

Coaches
 Nick Capurro (1972–73)

Stadiums
1972: St. Xavier High School
1973: Nippert Stadium (playoff game against Cleveland played at St. Xavier High School)
1974–75: Trechter Stadium, Cincinnati Technical College, now Cincinnati State Technical and Community College

Year-by-year

Honors
League Championship
 Winner (1): 1972
 Runner Up (1): 1973

League MVP
 1972: Ringo Cantillo
 1974: Ringo Cantillo

Leading Scorer
 1973: Eddy Roberts

Leading Goalkeeper
 1973: Antion Cruz

Coach of the Year
 1972: Nick Capurro

References

Comets
Defunct soccer clubs in Ohio
American Soccer League (1933–1983) teams
Soccer clubs in Ohio
1972 establishments in Ohio
1975 disestablishments in Ohio
Association football clubs established in 1972
Association football clubs disestablished in 1975